The 1889 Nelson by-election was a by-election held on 3 April 1889 in the  electorate during the 10th New Zealand Parliament.

The by-election was caused by the death on 11 February of the incumbent MP Henry Levestam. The by-election was won by Joseph Harkness. He was opposed by the Mayor of Nelson, John Sharp. Sharp had been the MP until he resigned in 1879.

Results
The following table gives the election result:

References

Nelson 1889
1889 elections in New Zealand
Politics of Nelson, New Zealand
April 1889 events